The Iranian Journal of Immunology is a quarterly peer-reviewed medical journal that covers research on all aspects of immunology. It is published by the Shiraz Institute for Cancer Research (Shiraz University of Medical Sciences) in association with the Iranian Society for Immunology.

Abstracting and indexing 
The Iranian Journal of Immunology is abstracted and indexed by MEDLINE/PubMed, EMBASE, EMNursing, GEOBASE, Cambridge Scientific Abstracts, Chemical Abstracts, Global Health, Index Medicus for Eastern Mediterranean Region, and Scopus.

External links
 

Immunology journals
Publications established in 2004
Quarterly journals
English-language journals
Shiraz University
Academic journals of Iran